The 2006–07 Arkansas Razorbacks men's basketball team  represented the University of Arkansas in the 2006–07 college basketball season. It was Stan Heath's fifth and final season as head coach of the Razorbacks. The team played its home games in Bud Walton Arena in Fayetteville, Arkansas.

Roster
Roster information retrieved from the Arkansas basketball media guide and HogStats.com.

Schedule and results
Schedule retrieved from HogStats.com.

|-
!colspan=12 style=|Exhibition

|-
!colspan=12 style=|Regular Season

|-
!colspan=12 style="background:#;"| SEC Tournament

|-
!colspan=12 style="background:#C41E3A;"| NCAA tournament

References

Arkansas
Arkansas Razorbacks men's basketball seasons
Arkansas